Milford is a borough located in western Hunterdon County, in the U.S. state of New Jersey. As of the 2020 United States census, the borough's population was 1,232, a decrease of one person (−0.1%) from the 2010 census count of 1,233, which in turn reflected an increase of 38 (+3.2%) from the 1,195 counted at the 2000 census.

Milford was incorporated as a borough by an act of the New Jersey Legislature on April 15, 1911, from portions of Holland Township, based on the results of a referendum held on May 8, 1911. The borough's incorporation was confirmed on March 13, 1925.

The borough is located on the Delaware River in the western portion of Hunterdon County, known as the Hunterdon Plateau. The Borough dates to the mid-18th century when a grist mill was established beside a river in what was then Bethlehem Township. After the mill was destroyed by fire in 1769, the settlement became known as Burnt Mills in Alexandria Township. The area was renamed as "Lowreytown" after Thomas Lowrey purchased land in the area in 1796. The community became commonly known as "Millford" or "Millsford" by the beginning of the 19th century, but by 1844 the name had lost a letter or two. By 1863 it was consistently spelled as "Milford". The community was incorporated in 1911 but the official incorporation was not registered until 1925.

Geography
According to the United States Census Bureau, the borough had a total area of 1.27 square miles (3.29 km2), including 1.18 square miles (3.06 km2) of land and 0.09 square miles (0.23 km2) of water (6.93%).

Milford borders the municipalities of Alexandria Township and Holland Township in Hunterdon County; and Bridgeton Township in Bucks County, Pennsylvania across the Delaware River in the Commonwealth of Pennsylvania.

Demographics

2010 census

The Census Bureau's 2006–2010 American Community Survey showed that (in 2010 inflation-adjusted dollars) median household income was $75,948 (with a margin of error of +/− $6,902) and the median family income was $79,653 (+/− $5,673). Males had a median income of $52,679 (+/− $12,062) versus $42,778 (+/− $8,377) for females. The per capita income for the borough was $32,823 (+/− $2,774). About 0.9% of families and 2.6% of the population were below the poverty line, including none of those under age 18 and 6.6% of those age 65 or over.

2000 census
At the 2000 United States census there were 1,195 people, 469 households and 323 families residing in the borough. The population density was 1,037.7 per square mile (401.2/km2). There were 484 housing units at an average density of 420.3 per square mile (162.5/km2). The racial makeup of the borough was 97.57% White, 0.17% African American, 0.17% Native American, 0.42% Asian, 0.33% Pacific Islander, 0.08% from other races, and 1.26% from two or more races. Hispanic or Latino of any race were 2.01% of the population.

There were 469 households, of which 33.5% had children under the age of 18 living with them, 59.1% were married couples living together, 5.5% had a female householder with no husband present, and 31.1% were non-families. 27.1% of all households were made up of individuals, and 11.9% had someone living alone who was 65 years of age or older. The average household size was 2.55 and the average family size was 3.11.

25.4% of the population were under the age of 18, 4.6% from 18 to 24, 33.3% from 25 to 44, 23.1% from 45 to 64, and 13.6% who were 65 years of age or older. The median age was 39 years. For every 100 females, there were 102.9 males. For every 100 females age 18 and over, there were 97.3 males.

The median household income was $54,519 and the median family income was $62,167. Males had a median income of $46,500 and females $31,765. The per capita income was $25,039. About 1.8% of families and 3.7% of the population were below the poverty line, including 3.7% of those under age 18 and 6.4% of those age 65 or over.

Government

Local government
Milford is governed under the Borough form of New Jersey municipal government, one of 218 municipalities (of the 564) statewide that use this form, the most commonly used form of government in the state. The governing body is comprised of the Mayor and the Borough Council, with all positions elected at-large on a partisan basis as part of the November general election. A Mayor is elected directly by the voters to a four-year term of office. The Borough Council is comprised of six members, who are elected to serve three-year terms on a staggered basis, with two seats coming up for election each year in a three-year cycle. The Borough form of government used by Milford is a "weak mayor / strong council" government in which council members act as the legislative body with the mayor presiding at meetings and voting only in the event of a tie. The mayor can veto ordinances subject to an override by a two-thirds majority vote of the council. The mayor makes committee and liaison assignments for council members, and most appointments are made by the mayor with the advice and consent of the council.

, the Mayor of Milford Borough is Republican Henry Schepens, whose term of office ends December 31, 2023. Members of the Borough Council are Noralie LaFevre (R, 2022), Janice Armstrong (R, 2022), Robert Castagna (R, 2024), Robert E. White (D, 2023) and Elisa Yager (R, 2024), with one seat vacant.

In February 2023, Russell Heller was shot and killed at a PSE&G facility by a former employee, leaving his seat expiring in December 2023 vacant.

In November 2018, Henry Schepens was elected to serve the balance of the term as mayor expiring in December 2019 that had been held by Ronald R. Rehl.

In January 2016, the Common Council selected Carole Heller to fill the seat expiring in December 2017 that became vacant after Ronald Rehl stepped down to be sworn in as mayor.

Federal, state and county representation
Milford is located in the 7th Congressional District and is part of New Jersey's 23rd state legislative district.

Politics
On March 2011, there were 823 registered voters in Milford Township, of whom 206 (25.0%) were registered as Democrats, 304 (36.9%) as Republicans and 313 (38.0%) as unaffiliated. There were no voters registered to other parties.

In the 2012 presidential election, Republican Mitt Romney received 49.7% of the vote (314 cast), ahead of Democrat Barack Obama with 47.0% (297 votes), and other candidates with 3.3% (21 votes), among the 635 ballots cast by the borough's 855 registered voters (3 ballots were spoiled), for a turnout of 74.3%. In the 2008 presidential election, Republican John McCain received 51.4% of the vote (340 cast), ahead of Democrat Barack Obama with 46.4% (307 votes) and other candidates with 2.1% (14 votes), among the 661 ballots cast by the township's 840 registered voters, for a turnout of 78.7%. In the 2004 presidential election, Republican George W. Bush received 57.9% of the vote (364 ballots cast), outpolling Democrat John Kerry with 40.7% (256 votes) and other candidates with 1.1% (9 votes), among the 629 ballots cast by the township's 787 registered voters, for a turnout percentage of 79.9.

In the 2013 gubernatorial election, Republican Chris Christie received 67.8% of the vote (274 cast), ahead of Democrat Barbara Buono with 29.2% (118 votes), and other candidates with 3.0% (12 votes), among the 407 ballots cast by the borough's 851 registered voters (3 ballots were spoiled), for a turnout of 47.8%. In the 2009 gubernatorial election, Republican Chris Christie received 58.4% of the vote (281 ballots cast), ahead of  Democrat Jon Corzine with 28.1% (135 votes), Independent Chris Daggett with 10.6% (51 votes) and other candidates with 1.9% (9 votes), among the 481 ballots cast by the township's 827 registered voters, yielding a 58.2% turnout.

Education
The Milford Borough School District serves public school students in pre-kindergarten through eighth grade at Milford Public School. As of the 2018–19 school year, the district, comprised of one school, had an enrollment of 88 students and 11.4 classroom teachers (on an FTE basis), for a student–teacher ratio of 7.7:1. In the 2016–2017 school year, Milford was the 5th-smallest enrollment of any school district in the state, with 81 students.

Students in public school for ninth through twelfth grades attend Delaware Valley Regional High School, together with students from Alexandria Township, Frenchtown, Holland Township and Kingwood Township. As of the 2018–19 school year, the high school had an enrollment of 721 students and 68.4 classroom teachers (on an FTE basis), for a student–teacher ratio of 10.5:1. The nine seats on the high school district's board of education are allocated based on the population of the constituent municipalities, with one seat assigned to Milford.

Eighth grade students from all of Hunterdon County are eligible to apply to attend the high school programs offered by the Hunterdon County Vocational School District, a county-wide vocational school district that offers career and technical education at its campuses in Raritan Township and at programs sited at local high schools, with no tuition charged to students for attendance.

Transportation

Roads and highways

County Route 519 (CR 519) is the only major roadway passing through Milford.

The Upper Black Eddy – Milford Bridge, owned and operated by the Delaware River Joint Toll Bridge Commission, carries Bridge Street across the Delaware River, connecting CR 519 in Milford with Pennsylvania Route 32 in Upper Black Eddy, Pennsylvania. The existing bridge was constructed in 1933 on the site of a covered bridge built in 1842 and another partially destroyed in a 1903 flood.

Public transportation
The Hunterdon County LINK provide bus service on Routes 17 / 18, which operate between Milford and Clinton.

Notable people

People who were born in, residents of, or otherwise closely associated with Milford include:

 Louis Adamic (1899–1951), Slovene-American author and translator
 Carlton Cooley (1898–1981), violist and composer
 Elias Deemer (1838–1918) member of the United States House of Representatives from Pennsylvania from 1901 to 1907
 Richard Egielski (born 1952), illustrator who was awarded the 1987 Caldecott Medal for his work in the book Hey, Al, written by Arthur Yorinks
 Wanda Gág (1893–1946), artist and author of children's books (Millions of Cats)
 Thomas Lowrey (1737–1809), settled in Milford in the 1790s and built the first hotel and grist mill on Bridge Street. He named the town Lowreytown, but it was renamed Millsford following his death in 1809
 George C. Ludlow (1830–1900), 25th Governor of New Jersey
 Abigail Roberts (1791–1841), pioneer in religion and women's rights who was one of the first American women to serve as a minister and established the United Church in Milford

See also
Hunterdon Plateau

References

External links

 Milford Borough website
 Milford on the Delaware website
 Hunterdon County web page for Milford Borough
 Milford Public School
 
 School Data for the Milford Borough School District, National Center for Education Statistics
 Delaware Valley Regional High School District
 Hunterdon Land Trust Alliance
 Milford Borough Historical Society

 
1911 establishments in New Jersey
Borough form of New Jersey government
Boroughs in Hunterdon County, New Jersey
Populated places established in 1911
New Jersey populated places on the Delaware River